Kabanga may refer to:

 Kabanga, Kigoma Region
 Kabanga, Kagera Region

 Cikabanga, a pidgin of isiZulu with influence from iciBemba